Samson or Sampson's Rock is a glacial erratic boulder in Madison in New Haven County, Connecticut that, according to Algonquin legend, was formed by Odziozo the giant. The legend says that Odziozo created it after he flung some land out to sea, creating Tuxis Island. The hole filled up to become Tuxis Pond. One rock fell from his hand and became Samson Rock. While leaving, he stepped on the rock. The rock contains a somewhat foot-shaped indent on top which the Algonquin pointed to in order to support this tale. The European settlers assigned this legend to the Biblical Samson after being told the legend in the 1600s, giving the rock its name. Samson Rock has been preserved for its legendary significance, but is relatively hard to find, tucked between two shopping centers and a parking lot. The rock which it sits has been fit with a bronze plaque commemorating the legend of the rock, and a road has been named after it. The plaque was placed by the Madison Foundation, as well as the Madison Rotary Club and Stop and Shop. A bus stop also shares the name.

Sometime in late December, 2012, the plaque was vandalized. The vandal had crossed out Samson and replaced it with a heavily charged term. It has since been returned to its normal condition.

The rock that Samson Rock sits on is not a glacial deposit.

See also
Tuxis Island
Tuxis Pond
Lake Champlain
Odziozo
Samson
Rock Dunder

References

Landforms of New Haven County, Connecticut
Madison, Connecticut